Unique II (previously Unique 2) is a Eurodance project from Austria. They are best known for their 1996 dance cover of Matthew Wilder's "Break My Stride", which reached No. 1 in Austria and New Zealand, and No. 2 in Australia.

History
Unique II was founded in 1992 by Austrian music producers Erwin Geppner and Werner Freistätter. Together with singer Sandy Cooper and rapper Def Tone they developed the first single, "Iko Iko", which reached No. 8 in Austria. Their debut album Internity reached No. 25 in Austria. A short time later, Sandy Cooper and Def Tone left the group and were replaced by singer Jade Davis and rapper B-Nice. In 1996, Unique II produced their version of Matthew Wilder's classic "Break My Stride". This became the group's biggest success, reaching number 1 in Austria and New Zealand, and No. 2 in Australia. Later that year they released their second album Level II, which reached No. 17 in Austria. Other hits from this album included "Loveline", "Do What You Please" and "I Still Go On", which peaked at No. 2, No. 6 and No. 12, respectively, in Austria. In the late 1990s, Jade Davies left Unique II to begin a solo career. She was replaced by Dutch singer Phoebe Caren. In 1997, B-Nice left the group for a solo career. The group went on a hiatus until 2000 when they released the album Forever, which reached No. 28 in Austria and the eponymous single featuring Filipino singer Sheila Fernandez, which reached No. 8. In the early 2000s, English-born rapper Christian Troy joined the group, and Sheila Fernandez became the new singer. In 2003, they released a Best Of album, featuring remixes of "Break My Stride" and "Loveline". Unique II has become the most successful dance-pop band in Austria, and have received numerous awards, both nationally and worldwide.

Discography

Studio albums

Compilation albums
Best of Unique II – The Golden Experience (2002)

Singles

References

Links
 Unique II on Discogs

Austrian Eurodance groups
Musical groups established in 1992